Ravina Raj Kohli, earlier President of the STAR News and the Chief Executive officer of Channel Nine, is one of the prominent media personality of India.

She was appointed as the President of Star news Channel, to transition its break from NDTV. Before that, Australian media tycoon, Kerry Packer chose her to head Channel Nine in India. Prior to Channel 9, Ravina was Senior Vice President Programming and Marketing for Sony Entertainment Television after her return from Singapore as Executive Creative Director of CR and Grey Advertising.

She is also the founder and Executive Director of JobCorp Company which is dedicated for empowerment of women.

References
The Voyage To Excellence by Nichinta Amarnath and Debashish Ghosh)

Businesspeople from Madhya Pradesh
Living people
Businesswomen from Madhya Pradesh
Year of birth missing (living people)